Lee Todd (born 7 March 1972) is an English retired professional footballer who played as a defender.

Playing career
Todd started his career in 1988 as a junior with Hartlepool United with whom he stayed until 1990.

In the summer of 1990 Todd transferred to Stockport County on a free transfer. Lee spent seven years at Stockport notching up a total of 226 league appearances including two promotions and a League Cup Semi-Final appearance.

In 1997 Todd was bought by his former Stockport County manager Dave Jones who was now managing Southampton paying £850,000 for his services. During his time at Southampton he played just ten league games, which included playing the full 90 minutes as Southampton won 3–2 against Liverpool at Anfield.

After spending a year in the Premier League, Todd moved on again in search of more regular football. This time it was to Bradford City for a fee of £250,000. Todd spent two years at Bradford City notching up only 15 league appearances. In September 1999, he spent a month out on loan at Walsall but was limited to just one start.

In 2000 Todd moved on again this time to Rochdale on a free transfer where he spent three years until 2003. During this period Todd clocked up 50 league appearances and scored three goals for the club.

In 2003 Todd moved on another free transfer to Mossley but spent only a month with the club before free transferring again this time to Stalybridge Celtic.

References

External links

1972 births
Living people
Footballers from Hartlepool
English footballers
Association football defenders
Hartlepool United F.C. players
Stockport County F.C. players
Southampton F.C. players
Bradford City A.F.C. players
Walsall F.C. players
Rochdale A.F.C. players
Mossley A.F.C. players
Stalybridge Celtic F.C. players
English Football League players
Premier League players